The 2011 ASA Kwik-Trip Midwest Tour presented by Echo Outdoor Power Equipment and grandstay.net was the fifth season of the American Speed Association's Midwest Tour.  The championship was held over 12 races, beginning May 1 in Oregon, Wisconsin, and ending October 9 in West Salem, Wisconsin.  Andrew Morrissey was the champion.

Schedule and results

Championship points

References

Asa Midwest Tour
ASA Midwest Tour seasons